was a Japanese botanist noted for identifying at least 19 species of flowering plants in Japan.  He was a senior member of the editorial board of the Journal of Japanese Botany.

References 

1880s births
1964 deaths
20th-century Japanese botanists
Japanese taxonomists